Dissident Alliance is the second studio album from the American heavy metal band Jag Panzer. It is the only album with vocalist Daniel J. Conca.

Track list

Personnel 
Daniel J. Conca – vocals
Mark Briody – guitar
Chris Kostka – guitar
John Tetley – bass
Rikard Stjernquist – drums

References

1995 albums
Jag Panzer albums
Groove metal albums